Bucșani is a commune in Dâmbovița County, Muntenia, Romania. It is composed of four villages: Bucșani, Hăbeni, Racovița and Rățoaia.

References

External links
Official site 
History of Bucșani 
Official site of the "Zimbraria Neagra" nature reserve where 35 European bisons live 

Communes in Dâmbovița County
Localities in Muntenia
Nature reserves in Romania